George 'Digger' Stanley (28 February 1876 – 7 March 1919) was an English boxer who was British and European bantamweight boxing champion.

Early life
Stanley was a gypsy, and was born in a caravan at Kingston-upon-Thames. He could not read or write, but developed into a clever boxer. His early boxing career was spent fighting in fairground booths.

Professional career
He began boxing professionally in 1899. In November 1903 he won the vacant British bantamweight title and in December of the same year he won the British flyweight title, but the titles were not recognised by the British Boxing Board of Control until 1909.

In October 1910 he fought Joe Bowker for the British and European bantamweight titles. He scored an eighth-round knockout to secure the titles. Stanley was also recognised by the National Sporting Club as the holder of the World bantamweight title, although he was not recognised as such in America.

In December 1910 he defended his British title against Johnny Condon, winning on points. In September 1911 he defended it again, against Ike Bradley, again winning on points.

In April and June 1912, he defended his European title twice against the Frenchman, Charles Ledoux. He won the first fight in Covent Garden on points, but lost the second fight in Dieppe, being knocked out in the seventh round.

In October 1912, he successfully defended his British title against Alex Lafferty, winning on points.

In June 1913, he lost his British title to Bill Beynon, on points, but four months later he beat Benyon on points to regain it. However, in his next defence, in April 1914, he lost the British title to Curley Walker on a disqualification in the thirteenth.

He continued to box but had only ten more fights, losing eight of them and winning two.

He had his last fight in February 1919, losing to Mike Blake, and died a month later, in poverty.

Lonsdale belt
In 1909, the National Sporting Club began awarding a Lonsdale Belt to the British champion at each weight. The belts were made from 22 carat gold and enamel. Digger Stanley was awarded the first bantamweight belt and was allowed to retain it after successfully defending his British title.

Professional boxing record

All newspaper decisions are officially regarded as “no decision” bouts and are not counted in the win/loss/draw column.

See also
 List of British bantamweight boxing champions

External links
 

1876 births
1919 deaths
English male boxers
Bantamweight boxers
European Boxing Union champions